Nilanjanaa Senguptaa (née Sharma) is an actress. She played the role of Mona Joshi, in the show Hip Hip Hooray. Her debut movie was director Subrata Sen's Swapner Feriwala. She is a graduate of English literature.  She produced the television serial Tomay Amay Mile.

She is the daughter of Anjana Bhowmik. Her younger sister Chandana Sharma is also an actress. She is married to Bengali actor Jisshu Sengupta and has two daughters named Sara Sengupta and Zara Sengupta.

Television

As actor /TELEVISION
Hip Hip Hurray .... Mona (Zee Tv)
Sansar (Zee Tv)
Saturday Suspense (Zee Tv)
Mrityudand (Zee Tv)
Darr (Star Plus)
Star Best Sellers (Star Plus)
Rishtey (Zee Tv)
Jaaneman Jaaneman .... MayaLekin Woh Sach ThaAporajito (Star Jalsha)
Shudhu Tomari Jonnyo (ETV Bangla)
As an ACTOR / FILMS 

 Shopner Feriwala
 Teen Ekke Teen
 Amra

As Producer
Ghosh and Company (2008)
Dancing Star (2009)
Aporajito (2011)
Tomay Amay Mile (2013)
Antakshari Premiere League (2013)
Shesh Theke Shuru (2014)
Shob Choritro Kalponik (2015)
Shonge Srijit (2015)
Bhalobasha Bhalobasha (2016)
Jhumur (2017)
Horogouri Pice Hotel (2022)

Filmography
 Swapner Feriwala (2003)
 Teen Ekke Teen (2006)
 Aamra (2007)

Awards 

 2003: BFJA-Most Promising Actress Award for Swapner Pheriwala

References

External links

Living people
Actresses in Bengali cinema
Indian film actresses
University of Mumbai alumni
Actresses from Mumbai
21st-century Indian actresses
Year of birth missing (living people)